SMS Brummer was a minelaying light cruiser of the German Kaiserliche Marine; she was the lead ship of her class. Brummer was laid down at AG Vulcan's shipyard in Stettin, Germany (now Szczecin, Poland) on 24 April 1915 and launched on 11 December 1915 and completed on 2 April 1916. Armed with a main battery of four  guns in single mounts, she carried 400 mines.

Despite being designed as a minelayer, the German Navy never operated her as such. She and her sister were used to raid a British convoy to Norway in October 1917. The two cruisers sank two escorting destroyers and nine of the twelve merchant ships of the convoy. The Kaiserliche Marine considered sending the two ships to attack convoys in the Atlantic Ocean, but the difficulties associated with refueling at sea convinced the Germans to abandon the plan. Brummer was included in the list of ships interned at Scapa Flow following the Armistice. On 21 June 1919, the commander of the interned fleet, Rear Admiral Ludwig von Reuter, ordered the scuttling of the fleet. Brummer was successfully scuttled, and unlike most of the other wrecks, she was never raised for scrapping.

Design

Her propulsion system consisted of two sets of  steam turbines powered by two coal-fired and four oil-fired Marine-type water-tube boilers, which were ducted into three funnels. In service however, the ship reached .

The ship was armed with four  SK L/45 guns in single pedestal mounts; two were arranged forward on the centerline, forward and aft of the conning tower, and two were placed in a superfiring pair aft. They were supplied with 600 rounds of ammunition, for 150 shells per gun. Brummer also carried two  SK L/45 anti-aircraft guns mounted on the centerline astern of the funnels. She was also equipped with a pair of  torpedo tubes with four torpedoes in a swivel mount amidships. Designed as a minelayer, she carried 400 mines.

Service
Brummer was ordered under the contract name Mine Steamer C and was laid down at the AG Vulcan shipyard in Stettin on 24 April 1915. She was launched on 11 December 1915, after which fitting-out work commenced. Completed in less than four months, she was commissioned into the High Seas Fleet on 2 April 1916. Brummer was ready for service with the fleet by May 1916, though she did not steam with the rest of the High Seas Fleet for the Battle of Jutland at the end of the month.

In the autumn of 1917, Admiral Reinhard Scheer, the chief of the Admiralstab, decided to supplement the U-boat campaign with surface raiders to attack the British convoys to Scandinavia. In addition to damaging British shipping, Scheer sought to divert escorts from the Atlantic theater, where his U-boats were concentrated. Brummer, commanded by Fregattenkapitän Leonhardi, and Bremse, commanded by Fregattenkapitän Westerkamp, were selected for the first such operation. Their high speed and large radius of action, coupled with their resemblance to British light cruisers, made them suited to the task. In preparation for the raid, their crews painted the ships dark gray to further camouflage them as British vessels.

The German ruse worked, and the British destroyers initially thought they were friendly ships. Strongbow was quickly destroyed, and as Mary Rose rushed to engage, she too was sunk. The Germans then quickly sank nine of the merchant vessels; the two trawlers and three merchant ships managed to escape. The British Admiralty was not informed of the attack until Brummer and Bremse were on the return leg of the voyage. Kaiser Wilhelm II celebrated the results of the attack with champagne. The success of the two ships and the commitment of heavier British convoy escorts led Scheer to attempt to attack one of the heavily defended convoys with the entire High Seas Fleet in April 1918, though this ended without success.

Late in the war, the Admiralstab considered sending Brummer and Bremse on a commerce raiding mission into the Atlantic. They were to operate off the Azores in concert with an oiler. The central Atlantic was out of the normal range of the U-boats, and convoys were therefore lightly defended in the area. The Admiralstab canceled the plan, however, after it was determined that refueling at sea would be too difficult.
Brummer was to have been part of the final sortie of the High Seas Fleet in October 1918, but this operation was cancelled due to the mutiny of the High Seas Fleet in Wilhelmshaven, after which Brummer was moved to Sassnitz.

Fate
Along with the most modern units of the High Seas Fleet, Brummer and Bremse were included in the ships specified for internment at Scapa Flow by the victorious Allied powers. The ships steamed out of Germany on 21 November 1918 in single file, commanded by Rear Admiral Ludwig von Reuter. They were met at sea by a combined fleet of 370 British, American, and French warships. The fleet arrived in the Firth of Forth later that day, and between 25 and 27 November, they were escorted to Scapa Flow. Upon arrival, all wireless equipment was removed from the ships and the breech blocks of their heavy guns were removed to prevent their use. Crews were reduced to minimum levels.

The fleet remained in captivity during the negotiations that ultimately produced the Treaty of Versailles. Reuter believed that the British intended to seize the German ships on 21 June 1919, which was the deadline for Germany to have signed the peace treaty. Unaware that the deadline had been extended to the 23rd, Reuter ordered the ships to be sunk at the next opportunity. On the morning of 21 June, the British fleet left Scapa Flow to conduct training maneuvers, and at 11:20 Reuter transmitted the order to his ships. Brummer sank at 13:05; she was never raised for scrapping and remains on the bottom of Scapa Flow. The salvage rights to the wreck passed through various hands between 1962 and 1981; ownership of the wreck was transferred from the Ministry of Defence (United Kingdom) to Orkney Islands Council in 1985; the wreck was declared a scheduled monument on 23 May 2001. In 2017, marine archaeologists from the Orkney Research Center for Archaeology conducted extensive surveys of Brummer and nine other wrecks in the area, including six other German and three British warships. The archaeologists mapped the wrecks with sonar and examined them with remotely operated underwater vehicles as part of an effort to determine how the wrecks are deteriorating.

Notes

References

Further reading
 

Brummer-class cruisers
Ships built in Stettin
1915 ships
World War I cruisers of Germany
World War I minelayers of Germany
World War I warships scuttled at Scapa Flow
Maritime incidents in 1919